Barlas is a surname. Notable people with the surname include:

Ali Barlas (1869–1953), Turkish politician 
Aqil Hussain Barlas (1927–1989), Indian lawyer and diplomat
Asma Barlas (born 1950), Pakistani journalist
Cemil Sait Barlas (1905–1964), Turkish journalist and politician
Faruk Barlas (1915–1994), Turkish football player
Fevziye Rahgozar Barlas (born 1955), Afghan poet
John Barlas (1860–1914), English poet and political activist
Serpil Barlas (1957–2021), Turkish actress and singer
Simay Barlas (born 1998), Turkish actress
Tuqachar Barlas (date of birth unknown–1221), Borjigin prince

Surnames of Turkish origin
Indian people of Turkic descent
Indian surnames